"In My Feelings" is a 2018 song by Drake.

In My Feelings may also refer to:

In My Feelings (EP), a 2018 EP by Aja
"In My Feelings", a 2014 song by Kevin Gates from Luca Brasi 2
"In My Feelings", a 2015 mixtape by Lee Major
"In My Feelings", a 2015 mixtape by Trevor Jackson 
"In My Feelings", a 2016 mixtape by Boosie Badazz
"In My Feelings", a 2016 song by Nelson Freitas
"In My Feelings", a 2017 song by Kehlani from SweetSexySavage
"In My Feelings", a 2017 song by Lana Del Rey from Lust for Life